Eamonn "Chick" Deacy (1 October 1958 – 13 February 2012) was a professional footballer from Galway, Ireland.

After a trial at Clyde Deacy made an impressive League of Ireland debut for Sligo Rovers away to Shelbourne at Harold's Cross Stadium on 14 December 1975.

His only win in Sligo's colours came at Glenmalure Park on 4 January 1976. The next month he faced Geoff Hurst at Turners Cross.

His debut game for his home town club was in the FAI League Cup on 5 September 1976. In his third League Cup game against Sligo Rovers, he was sent off.

Deacy made his debut for Limerick on 28 November 1976 at Flower Lodge. At the end of the season, he was on the losing side in the FAI Cup Final. However, in his last game for the Shannonsiders he won the Munster Senior Cup.

Deacy scored Galway Rovers first goal in the League of Ireland on 2 October 1977.

The 21-year-old full back left Galway Rovers for Aston Villa in February 1979, after writing 12 letters to the club requesting a trial. He went on to have an unforgettable five years at the club, during which time they won the League Championship, European Cup and European Super Cup.

He was one of only 14 players used by Ron Saunders in the 1980–81 league-winning season, making enough appearances (11 in all, including six starts) to win a medal (he was Villa's number 12 on 19 occasions that season). He made one appearance for Villa in European competition against Juventus in the 1982–83 European Cup. He had a brief loan spell at Derby, where he played five games, before rejecting an offer of a new two-year deal from Villa to return home to Galway.

Deacy's first game back in the Maroon was in a League of Ireland Cup tie against Finn Harps on 2 September 1984.

His last League of Ireland game was also in Harold's Cross on St Patrick's Day 1991 away to St Patrick's Athletic.

He won 4 caps for the Republic of Ireland national football team. He also played for the Republic of Ireland national football team amateur team that qualified for the 1978 UEFA Amateur Cup.

He died following a heart attack on 13 February 2012. 
Terryland Park was renamed Eamonn Deacy Park in honour of Chick  
A testimonial was held on 18 August at Eamonn Deacy Park.

Honours
Galway United
 FAI Cup (1): 1991
 FAI League Cup (1): 1985–86
Limerick
 Munster Senior Cup (1): 1977
Aston Villa
 Football League First Division (1): 1980–81
 FA Charity Shield (1): 1981 (shared)
 European Cup (1): 1982
 European Super Cup (1): 1982

References

Republic of Ireland association footballers
Association football fullbacks
Association footballers from County Galway
League of Ireland players
English Football League players
Limerick F.C. players
Galway United F.C. (1937–2011) players
Sligo Rovers F.C. players
League of Ireland XI players
Republic of Ireland international footballers
Aston Villa F.C. players
Derby County F.C. players
Galway United F.C. managers
1958 births
2012 deaths
Republic of Ireland football managers